Dr Bhola Singh (born 10 September 1977) is an Indian politician from Shikarpur, Bulandshahr district belonging to Bhartiya Janata Party. He is director of Yaskin Infotech and Yaskin Enterprises.

He contested and was elected in 2014 and 2019 Lok Sabha elections from Bulandshahr (Lok Sabha constituency) as BJP candidate.

Early life and education

Bhola Singh was born on 10 September 1977 to Shri Kishan Lal Singh and Smt. Mallo Devi. He was born in a village named Bohich in Bulandshahr district in Uttar Pradesh. Bhola Singh completed his graduation from Chaudhary Charan Singh (CCS) University, Meerut. He married Anuradha Singh on 6 May 2002.

Positions held 
Bhola Singh has been elected 2 times as Lok Sabha MP.

References

1977 births
People from Bulandshahr district
India MPs 2014–2019
Living people
Lok Sabha members from Uttar Pradesh
Bharatiya Janata Party politicians from Uttar Pradesh
India MPs 2019–present